The Melfa is a river in Lazio, Italy.

Melfa may also refer to:

 Melfa (Dogu'a Tembien), Ethiopia
 Melfa, Virginia, United States